Sokolovo is a rural locality (a village) in Vyatkinskoye Rural Settlement, Sudogodsky District, Vladimir Oblast, Russia. The population was 25 as of 2010. There are 5 streets.

Geography 
Sokolovo is located on the Ushcherka River, 27 km northwest of Sudogda (the district's administrative centre) by road. Stanki is the nearest rural locality.

References 

Rural localities in Sudogodsky District
Vladimirsky Uyezd